Haplochrois tanyptera is a moth in the family Elachistidae. It was described by Turner in 1923. It is found in Australia, where it has been recorded from Queensland.

References

Natural History Museum Lepidoptera generic names catalog

Moths described in 1923
Elachistidae
Moths of Australia